Donnelly v Westpac Banking Corp 
(1999) 6 NZBLC 102,781 is a cited case in New Zealand confirming that where a party has cancelled a contract on unjustifiable grounds, can legally cancel the contract if justifiable grounds are later discovered.

References

New Zealand contract case law
Westpac
1999 in New Zealand law
1999 in case law
High Court of New Zealand cases